The 2017–18 Western Illinois Leathernecks men's basketball team represented Western Illinois University during the 2017–18 NCAA Division I men's basketball season. The Leathernecks, led by fourth-year head coach Billy Wright, played their home games at Western Hall in Macomb, Illinois as members of the Summit League. They finished the season 12–16, 3–11 in Summit League play to finish in last place. They lost in the quarterfinals of the Summit League tournament to South Dakota State.

Previous season
The Leathernecks finished the season 8–20, 5–11 in Summit League play to finish in eighth place. They lost in the quarterfinals of the Summit League tournament to South Dakota.

Preseason 
In a poll of league coaches, media, and sports information directors, the Leathernecks were picked to finish last in the Summit League.

Roster

Schedule and results

|-
!colspan=9 style=| Regular season

|-
!colspan=9 style=| Summit League tournament

Source

References

Western Illinois Leathernecks men's basketball seasons
Western Illinois
Western
Western